Edith Ashover Taggart (11 November 1909 – 1997) was a unionist politician in Northern Ireland.

Taggart was elected as an Ulster Unionist Party member of the Senate of Northern Ireland in 1970, becoming only the second female member of the body (after Marion Greeves).  She served until its abolition in 1973.

References

External links
Brief biography of Edith Taggart

1909 births
1997 deaths
Women members of the Senate of Northern Ireland
Members of the Senate of Northern Ireland 1969–1973
Ulster Unionist Party members of the Senate of Northern Ireland